Pelopidas thrax, the pale small-branded swift, millet skipper or white branded swift, is a butterfly belonging to the family Hesperiidae. It is found in Greece, western and south-western Turkey, Israel, Lebanon, Syria, Iraq, Arabia, Africa, Kashmir (northern Pakistan) and the far east. In Greece, it is only known from Samos, Chios, and Rhodes, where it is found at altitudes of sea level to 75 meters.

In Greece, adults are on wing in June. In Turkey, two generations were recorded, the first from May to July, the second from late September to mid October.

The larvae are known to feed on Panicum miliaceum in northern Africa. Larvae of subspecies P. t. inconspicua have been recorded feeding on Imperata arundinacea, Ehrharta erecta, Oryza and Imperata species.

Subspecies
Pelopidas thrax thrax
Pelopidas thrax inconspicua (Bertolini, 1850) (from South Africa to Kenya)
Pelopidas thrax masta Evans, 1949

References

External links

thrax
Butterflies of Asia
Butterflies described in 1821
Butterflies of Europe